WIOU (1350 kHz) is a commercial AM radio station in Kokomo, Indiana.  It is owned by Hoosier AM/FM LLC, with studios and offices on Indiana State Road 26 in Kokomo.  It broadcasts a sports radio format, mostly from ESPN Radio.

WIOU is powered at 5,000 watts by day.  But at night, to avoid interference to other stations on 1350 AM, it reduces power to 1,000 watts.  It uses a directional antenna with a four-tower array.

History
On , WIOU first signed on the air.  It was owned by North Central Indiana Broadcasting and featured programming from the CBS Radio Network.  It was originally powered at 1,000 watts around the clock, but later got a daytime boost to 5,000 watts.

WIOU was established by Richard H. Blacklidge, William Naftzger, and John Carl Jefferies. Blacklidge was the CEO of the Kokomo Tribune newspaper at the time. Naftzger was a local attorney. Jefferies had been with radio station WKMO as general manager. The call letters, WIOU, were chosen by Naftzger's wife, Alma, since all were in debt to start the station.  IOU stands for "I Owe YoU."

On July 1, 2013, the station switched to a full-time sports format.

Sports teams
 Purdue University Basketball
 Indiana University Football and Basketball
 High School Football, Basketball, Baseball
 Network Indiana's Indiana Sports Talk with Bob Lovell

Transmitter
The main transmitter is an Harris MW-5A (circa '78) utilizing a single forced air cooled metal/ceramic triode vacuum tube (type number 3CX2500F3) in the final RF amplifier stage and a single forced air cooled tetrode vacuum tube (type number 4CX3000A) as a pulse duration modulator (PDM).  Due to the innovative design of this legacy rig, plate efficiency in the RF final amplifier stage is on the order of 92%.  The antenna system consists of four quarter wave towers in a phased array aligned in a single row to achieve greatest signal to the North during daytime operation.

References

External links

IOU (AM)